China Academy of Engineering Physics (CAEP) (Chinese: 中国工程物理研究院, nicknamed 九院) was founded in October 1958.   The CAEP is China's organization conducting the research, development, and testing of nuclear weapons and related science.  Formerly called the Ninth Institute, CAEP was initially located in Beijing.  Major components of its nuclear program were relocated to Qinghai Province in the 1950s. After China's first nuclear test in 1964, major components of the CAEP and China's nuclear weapons research, development, and production were moved to Sichuan Province to avoid detection by foreign powers. The academy was formerly named the Ninth Academy (or Institute) of the Second Ministry of Machine Industry.  It was renamed the China (or Chinese) Academy of Engineering Physics in the 1980s. CAEP has been on the United States Department of Commerce's Entity List since 1997.

Organization
The CAEP headquarters, since the 1980s, is in the 839 area of Mianyang and covers a land area of 5 km2. It's nicknamed Scientific Town. It has multiple components located in Beijing, Jiangyou, Mianyang, Chengdu, and Shanghai.

As of 2017, the CAEP staff has included as many as 23,000 scientists, engineers, mathematicians, and technicians.

Since the 1990s, the CAEP has included 12 research institutes and 15 national key laboratories. Its research areas include theoretical physics, plasma physics, engineering and material sciences, electronics and photo-electronics, materials chemistry and chemical engineering, computer science, and computational mathematics. Most of the names of the research organizations in the Mianyang area include "Southwest Institute" in their titles because they are located in the southwest part of China. The CAEP institutes include:
 Graduate School, Beijing
 Southwest Computer Center
 Institute of Applied Physics and Computational Mathematics, Beijing
 Southwest Institute of Chemical Materials, China
 Southwest Institute of Environmental Testing
 Southwest Institute of Electronic Engineering
 Southwest Institute of Explosives and Chemical Engineering
 Southwest Institute of Fluid Physics, China
 Southwest Institute of Environmental Testing
 Southwest Institute of Nuclear Physics and Chemistry, Mianyang 621900, Sichuan Province
 Southwest Institute of Structural Mechanics, Mianyang 621900, Sichuan Province
 Institute of Systems Engineering, Mianyang 6219000, Sichuan Province
 Terahertz Research Center, Mianyang, Sichuan Province
 Research Center of Laser Fusion, Mianyang, Sichuan Province

Notable and Prominent Chinese scientists that have been leaders of the academy 
 Yu Min (19262016), nuclear weapons designer
 Wang Ganchang (19071998), vice director of the Ninth Academy
 Deng Jiaxian (19241986), considered the father of China's nuclear weapons program
 Zhu Guangya (19242011), first director of the CAEP in 1994
 Chen Nengkuan (19232016), key contributor to the nuclear weapons program
 Zhou Guangzhao (1929 ), director of the nuclear weapons institute
 Guo Yonghuai (19091968), vice director of the Ninth Institute in 1960
 Cheng Kaijia (19182019), nuclear weapons designer and director of the Lop Nur test site
 Peng Huanwu (19152007), led the development of the first fission and thermonuclear weapons
The CAEP has included as many as 14 academicians of the Chinese Academy of Sciences (CAS) and 15 academicians of the Chinese Academy of Engineering (CAE), as well as many other outstanding Chinese scientists.

See also
 Mianyang Hi-Tech Industrial Development Zone
 China and weapons of mass destruction
 List of nuclear weapons tests of China
 Lop Nur Nuclear Weapons Test Base

References

Research institutes in China
Nuclear program of the People's Republic of China
Nuclear history of China